Jordan Hall is a concert hall in Boston, Massachusetts, and the principal performance space of the New England Conservatory. It may also refer to:

People 
Jordan Hall (writer), writer of the web series Carmilla
Jordan Hall (lacrosse) (b. 1984), Canadian professional lacrosse player
Jordan Hall (basketball), American basketball player

Places 
Jordan Hall, was the name of a building on the Stanford University Main Quad from 1917 to 2020 which is in the process of getting a new permanent name
Jordan Hall, was the name of the life sciences building on the Bloomington campus of Indiana University from 1956 to 2020